Pateville is an unincorporated community in Crisp County, in the U.S. state of Georgia.

History
The community was named after J. S. Pate, a pioneer citizen. A variant name is "Patesville".

References

Unincorporated communities in Crisp County, Georgia
Unincorporated communities in Georgia (U.S. state)